Arthur Schwab is the name of:

 Arthur J. Schwab (born 1946), United States federal judge
 Arthur Tell Schwab (1896–1945), Swiss race walker